Winchester Dam is a dam on the North Umpqua River in Winchester, Oregon. Constructed in 1890, the dam was added to the National Register of Historic Places in 1996.

The Winchester Dam was made from large timber cribs. Originally, the dam was a mere four feet high, which was raised to sixteen feet in 1907. The dam was the main source of water and electricity for the town of Roseburg until 1923. The dam's hydropower facilities have long since been removed, and the structure is now maintained solely for the recreational benefit of the Winchester Water Control District, composed of the private landowners surrounding the reservoir pool.

Public Safety 
The dam is officially categorized as "high hazard" by the Oregon Department of Water Resources , primarily due to likely loss of life in the case of dam failure among the people who frequent the river, parks, and boat ramps just downstream. Following an annual inspection in October 2019, state officials downgraded Winchester Dam’s condition to "poor," requested that the owners hire an engineer to comprehensively inspect its structure, and warned the owners to address known dam safety issues soon. According to the 2019 inspection report, Winchester Dam has not received a comprehensive structural inspection, nor have the owners updated the dam's required emergency action plan, since 1987.

Drinking Water Impacts 
In January 2020, the Oregon Department of Environmental Quality levied a $58,378 fine for violations during a repair at Winchester Dam in late 2018. According to DEQ, pollution from this repair degraded aquatic habitat, killed numerous fish, and harmed the primary drinking water source for the City of Roseburg and the Umpqua Basin Water Association – serving approximately 37,700 people combined. Officials found that dam repairs were conducted without following established best management practices, even after state and federal agencies provided information in advance on how to protect water quality and fish.

Harm to Fish 
In 1994, conservation group Oregon Natural Resources Council released a report titled "Damnable Dams" which called for the removal of a number of Pacific Northwest dams, including Winchester Dam, because of the harm these structures caused to salmon and other fish. Since then, other dams on the "Damnable Dams" list have come down, including Savage Rapids, Elk Creek, and Gold Ray dams in southern Oregon. However, Winchester Dam has remained.

In 2013, the Oregon Department of Fish and Wildlife placed Winchester Dam on the Statewide Fish Passage Priority List, an official listing of Oregon's top artificial obstructions to native migratory fish. In 2019, Winchester Dam was raised to the second highest ranked privately-owned dam on the Statewide Fish Passage Priority List, where it is noted for impeding passage to 160 miles of high quality habitat for spring Chinook, fall Chinook, summer steelhead, winter steelhead, cutthroat trout, and Pacific Lamprey, as well as Southern Oregon Coast Coho which are listed as threatened under the Endangered Species Act.

Oregon Department of Fish and Wildlife staff maintain and operate the Winchester Dam’s fish ladder through an easement providing access, but lack a substantive written system or analysis for maximizing fish passage efficiency at different flows. Winchester’s ladder has a number of right angle turns and the ability to control flow velocities in the ladder is limited, making it difficult to pass fish at a wide range of flows. In mid-2019, after the dam owners objected, state officials declined the offer of seventeen conservation and fishing groups to fully fund an aquatic engineer to independently analyze the ladder and create a comprehensive system for maximizing ladder efficiency at different flows.

Fish Counting Station
Although the fish ladder at Winchester Dam does not meet current federal standards for passing fish, it has generated information for fishery management decisions since 1945. There is a fish counting station maintained by the Oregon Department of Fish and Wildlife here. At the station, biologists count fish to monitor population, design management methods, and prescribe angling regulations. Since 2015, funding for fish counting at the station has been significantly reduced, and local fishermen have questioned the accuracy of the station's results.

See also
 National Register of Historic Places listings in Douglas County, Oregon

References

1890 establishments in Oregon
Dams completed in 1890
Dams on the National Register of Historic Places in Oregon
National Register of Historic Places in Douglas County, Oregon